Coller Capital is one of the largest global investors in the private equity secondary market ("secondaries"). It was founded in 1990 by the UK-based investor and philanthropist Jeremy Coller.

History 

Coller Capital completed its first notable deal in 1998, when it acquired a $265-m portfolio of limited partnership interests from Shell's US Pensions Trust. Secondaries Investor magazine observed that the deal was unusual for its size, being at that point the single biggest secondary transaction on record, with Coller betting his entire $240-m eponymous fund.

The firm is now among the world’s biggest secondaries specialists. It has raised over $30-billion across nine funds. Some of its transactions are among the largest in the private equity secondary market, including deals of $1-billion without the need for syndication. It has also made single investments as small as $1-million.

Although Jeremy Coller did not create secondary investing, both he and his firm have come to be synonymous with the sector, with Private Equity News referring to Coller as "The Godfather of Secondaries".

Operations 
The firm provides liquidity to private equity investors, acquiring interests in private equity funds, portfolios of private companies, and other private equity-related assets.

As a secondary investor, Coller Capital acquires original investors’ stakes in private equity funds, such as venture capital, buyout and mezzanine funds, together with portfolios of companies or stakes in companies, from financial institutions, corporates, government bodies, family offices or charitable foundations. It holds interests in over 850 private equity funds and around 8,000 companies on behalf of investors.

Coller Capital operates from offices in London, New York, Hong Kong and Korea. It reports 200+ employees and 29 partners. It has just completed raising capital for its eighth fund.

Funds

Publications 
The firm publishes financial periodicals, white papers and surveys, including those by The Coller Institute of Venture at Tel Aviv University and the Coller Research Institute.

 The Coller Capital Global Private Equity Barometer, a biannual survey of investors.
 Private Equity Findings, debating academic research into private equity.
 Private Equity Secondary Market, a white paper of the secondary market’s theoretical framework.
 ESG Report, on the policies and practices of Coller Capital general partners.
 Coller Venture Review, aimed at institutional investors and limited partners, venture capitalists, public policymakers, and scholars in related fields, issued by the Coller Institute of Venture at Tel Aviv University.

Awards 
Financial News

 European PE Secondaries Firm of the Year x 6
 European Secondaries Deal of the Year

Real Deals

 Secondaries House of the Year x 2

PE International

 Secondaries Firm of the Year x 5
 European Secondaries Firm of the Year x 2
 European Secondaries Deal of the Year x 4
 Global Secondaries Firm of the Year
 Best Secondaries Firm

BVCA

 Responsible Investment Award

Private Equity Wire 
 
 European Awards: Best Secondaries Manager
 European Awards: Best Fundraising Firm (Secondaries)

IEMA
 Sustainability Impact Awards: Sustainable Finance Award

References

External links
Coller Capital

Private equity firms of the United Kingdom
Financial services companies based in London
Private equity secondary market